Chaqalvand Rud and Chaghalvand Rud may refer to:

Chaqalvand Rud-e Olya
Chaqalvand Rud-e Sofla